Football Manager 2022 (officially abbreviated as FM22) is a 2021 football-management simulation video game developed by Sports Interactive and published by Sega. It was released worldwide for Microsoft Windows and macOS on 8 November 2021. Football Manager 2022 Xbox Edition was released on Xbox Game Pass, and Football Manager 2022 Mobile for iOS and Android on the same day. The streamlined version of the game titled Football Manager 2022 Touch was released exclusively for Nintendo Switch on 8 November 2021.

Players who pre-ordered Football Manager 2022 from select retailers received early access to a beta version of the game on 22 October 2021. Physical copies of Football Manager 2022 did not include discs and instead shipped with Steam activation codes.

Features 
Football Manager 2022 comes with a variety of new features including a revamp of the data system with the introduction of the Data Hub which gives players information about match momentum, pass maps and the ability to request a data analyst to compile specific pieces of information. Additionally, the match engine is tweaked (in common with each edition). The new role of wide centre-back is added, which emulates the tactical style of Thomas Tuchel's Chelsea F.C. There is a new staff meeting system, with nearly 4000 new dialogue options introduced and the ability to explore a wider range of topics.

Reception 

Football Manager 2022 received "generally favorable" reviews, according to review aggregator Metacritic.

PC Gamer praised the game's addictiveness, writing, "If it were a team, Football Manager 2022 would be Liverpool. No big new signings, but there's already a star in every position...If it were a player, it would be world-class, the kind of signing that excites the dourest of fan." Tapsell of Eurogamer praised the game's vast depth, stating, "It's not impossible, but in Football Manager 2022 it's definitely harder to survive at the top on nothing but vibes. And it's more blissful than ever to compulsively clean up my own club's mess." PCGamesN wrote positively, saying, "They really sum up what Football Manager 2022 is all about: small, cherry-picked revisions that address a number of long-term complaints, and improve some aspects I never knew I wanted."

The game has made it to the top played game in Steam, being in the top 10 on the platform as of January 2, 2022

References

External links 
 

2022
Android (operating system) games
IOS games
MacOS games
Nintendo Switch games
Windows games
Xbox One games
Xbox Series X and Series S games
Video games developed in the United Kingdom
2021 video games